R Arae  is an Algol-type eclipsing binary in the constellation Ara. Located approximately  distant, it normally shines at magnitude 6.17, but during eclipses can fall as low as magnitude 7.32. It has been suggested by multiple studies that mass transfer is occurring between the two stars of this system, and the period of eclipses seems to be increasing over time. The primary is a blue-white main sequence star of spectral type B5V that is 5 times as massive as the Sun, while the secondary is a yellow-white star of spectral type F1IV that is 1.5 times as massive as the Sun. Stellar material is being stripped off the secondary and accreting on the primary.

The companion star is at a similar distance.

References

Ara (constellation)
Algol variables
149730
081589
Arae, R
Durchmusterung objects
B-type main-sequence stars
F-type subgiants